Zieria actites is a plant in the citrus family Rutaceae and is only found on a single, isolated mountain in Queensland. It is a dense, compact shrub with wiry branches, three-part leaves and small, cream to pale pink flowers with four petals and four stamens.

Description
The leaves have three parts, resembling clover leaves and have a smell like aniseed. The leaflets have a distinct mid-vein on the lower surface and transparent oil glands.

Taxonomy and naming
The specific epithet (actites) is said to be derived from the Greek word actites, meaning "watcher", referring to the fact that the Pacific ocean can be seen from the mountain tops where this species occurs. In Ancient Greek, aktitēs (ἀκτίτης) is however the word for "dweller on the coast".

Distribution and habitat

Conservation
This zieria is listed as "Endangered" under the Queensland Nature Conservation Act 1992.

References

External links

actites
Sapindales of Australia
Flora of Queensland
Taxa named by Marco Duretto
Plants described in 2007
Taxa named by Paul Irwin Forster